The Battle of Sri Muktsar Sahib (Muktsar) or Battle of Khidrāne Dee Dhāb took place on 29 December 1705, (29 Poh) following the siege of Anandpur Sahib. In 1704, Anandpur Sahib was under an extended siege by the allied forces of the Mughals and the hill chiefs.

During the siege 40 Sikhs, led by Maha Singh birth place Village ratoul , wrote letters of bedava (abandonment of a Sikh from his Guru) to Guru Gobind Singh ji. They arrived in the village of Jhabal where a Sikh woman named Mai Bhago, upon hearing their tale of desertion, motivated them into returning to Guru ji at Anandpur Sahib.

The 40 deserters with Mai Bhago returned to seek out Guru Gobind Singh ji, and joined him near Khidrāne Dee Dhāb preparing for battle against the Mughals. They fought the Mughals and died in the following battle. The guru, finding the dying Maha Singh on the battlefield after the battle, forgave him and his compatriots, tore up their letters of bedava, and blessed them for their service. The place was later renamed Muktsar, literally meaning The Pool of Liberation. Mai Bhago survived the battle and stayed on with Guru Gobind Singh ji as one of his bodyguards. The Mela Maghi is held at the holy city of Sri Muktsar Sahib every year in memory of the forty Sikh martyrs.

See also 

 Women in Sikhism

References

History of Sikhism
Conflicts in 1705
Muktsar
Mukhtsar